Honduras is an unincorporated community in Kirkland Township, Adams County, in the U.S. state of Indiana. All that remains today is a church and its activity center.

History
A post office was established at Honduras in 1890, and remained in operation until it was discontinued in 1904. A general store was in business in the early 1900's. The community was likely named after Honduras, in Latin America.

References

Unincorporated communities in Indiana
Unincorporated communities in Adams County, Indiana